= A384 =

A384 may refer to:

- Autovía A-384, a highway in Andalusia, Spain
- A384 road (England), a road in Devon
