= Autovía A-384 =

Highway in Andalusia, Spain

The Autovía A-384 is a highway in Spain. It passes through Andalusia.
